Local elections were held in the province of Cavite of the Philippines, on May 13, 2019 as part of the 2019 general election. Voters selected candidates for all local positions: a municipal and city mayor, vice mayor and councilors, as well as members of the Sangguniang Panlalawigan, the governor, vice governor and representatives for the eight districts of Cavite.

Provincial elections 
Incumbents are expressed in italics.

Governor 

Incumbent Governor Boying Remulla opted not to run for re-election to run for congressman for the 7th District and support to his younger brother, former Governor Jonvic Remulla, is his party's nominee.

Vice governor 
Incumbent Vice-Governor Ramon "Jolo" Revilla III was re-elected unopposed.

Congressional elections

1st District (Northern Cavite) 
Francis "Boyblue" Abaya is the incumbent. His opponent is Jose Luis "Jholo" Granados, the son of his 2016 opponent Marina Granados who died in April 2018.

2nd District (Bacoor) 
Incumbent Representative Strike Revilla is running unopposed.

3rd District (Imus) 
Incumbent Representative Alex Advincula is running unopposed.

4th District (Dasmariñas) 
Incumbent Representative Jennifer Barzaga opted to run for Mayor of Dasmariñas; she switched her position with her husband, Mayor Elpidio Barzaga, Jr. His opponents are Leonardo "Jun" Manicio, Jr. and retired Police Director, former ACT-CIS Partylist nominee (2016) Benhardi Mantele, and Aileen Padel.

5th District (Carsigma) 
Incumbent Representative Roy Loyola is term-limited and opted to run for Mayor of Carmona instead. His wife, incumbent Carmona Mayor Dahlia Loyola, is his party's nominee.

6th District (General Trias) 
Incumbent Representative Luis Ferrer IV is running unopposed.

7th District (Central Cavite)

8th District (Southwest Cavite) 
Incumbent 7th District Representative Abraham Tolentino is running unopposed.

Provincial board elections

1st District (Northern Cavite) 
City: Cavite City
Municipalities: Kawit, Noveleta, Rosario

2nd District (Bacoor) 
City: Bacoor

3rd District (Imus) 
City: Imus

4th District (Dasmariñas) 
City: Dasmariñas

5th District (Carsigma) 
Municipalities: Carmona, General Mariano Alvarez, Silang

6th District (General Trias) 
City: General Trias

7th District (Central Cavite) 
City: Trece Martires
Municipalities: Amadeo, Indang, Tanza

8th District (Southwest Cavite) 
City: Tagaytay
Municipalities: General Emilio Aguinaldo, Alfonso, Magallanes, Maragondon, Mendez, Naic, Ternate

City and municipal elections

1st District (Northern Cavite)

Cavite City 
Incumbent Mayor Bernardo "Totie" Paredes and Vice Mayor Denver Chua are running unopposed under the Nacionalista Party.

Kawit

Noveleta

Rosario

2nd District (Bacoor)

Bacoor 
Incumbent Mayor Lani Mercado-Revilla is running for reelection.

3rd District (Imus)

Imus

4th District (Dasmariñas)

Dasmariñas

5th District (CarSiGMA)

Carmona

General Mariano Alvarez

Silang 
Incumbent mayor, Omil Poblete is not running. Her sister, Corie Poblete is the party's nominee.

6th District (General Trias)

General Trias

7th District (Cavite Central)

Trece Martires 
Mayor Melandres de Sagun is term-limited. He withdrew his candidacy for Congressman of Seventh District after he was accused as the mastermind of the assassination of Vice Mayor Alexander Lubigan a few days after the assassination of Antonio Halili. His father, former Mayor Melencio de Sagun, Jr. is his party's nominee. His opponents are Lubigan's widow Gemma and Vice Mayor Denver Colorado who was elevated to the Vice Mayorship after Lubigan's assassination.

Amadeo 
Mayor Conrado Viado who was elevated to the Mayorship after the death of Mayor Albert Ambagan has opted to run as Vice Mayor.

Indang 
Both incumbent Mayor Perfecto Fidel and Vice Mayor Ismael Rodil are running unopposed.

Tanza

8th District (Cavite Southwest)

Tagaytay 
Both incumbent mayor Agnes Delgado-Tolentino, wife of incumbent 7th District representative Abraham Tolentino and sister-in-law of 2019 senatorial candidate Francis Tolentino, and running mate city Vice Mayor Raymond Ambion will be running unopposed, all 10 candidates for city council are filled.

Alfonso 
Mayor Virgilio Varias is term limited, although he was elected in the disputed elections of 2007 with former Mayor Jose Peñano. He will run for Board Member of Eight District under PDP-Laban. His party nominated Vice Mayor Randy Salamat with Councilor Madonna Mojica-Pel as his running mate.  Pel is opposed by outgoing Eight District Board Member Reinalyn Varias. Salamat will face Raul Rodis.

General Emilio Aguinaldo

Magallanes

Maragondon 
Councilor Lawrence Arca is running against incumbent Mayor Reynaldo Rillo.

Mendez 
Incumbent Mayor Eric Vida is running unopposed.

Naic

Ternate

References

2019 Philippine local elections
Elections in Cavite
May 2019 events in the Philippines
2019 elections in Calabarzon